Dongguandong (Dongguan East) railway station serves the city of Dongguan in Guangdong province, China. It is located in Dongguan's Changping Town.

The station is configured in an east-west alignment. Trains departing to the east continue along the Beijing–Kowloon railway towards Beijing.  To the west, there is a junction where the Beijing–Kowloon railway merges with the Guangzhou–Shenzhen railway.  The Guangzhou–Shenzhen railway continues south towards Hong Kong.  The Guangzhou–Shenzhen railway continues east through Dongguan railway station then onwards towards Guangzhou. There are also trains to other parts of China and to Shenzhen.

The station has a large main terminal with several floors, that serves trains to Hong Kong. In the main building, there is a customs gate, several shops, a fast food outlet, a ticket booth and office buildings above it. The smaller connected terminal serves domestic trains. It contains a small shop, several ticket machines, and a ticket booth.

Buildings and structures in Dongguan
Railway stations in Guangdong
Stations on the Beijing–Kowloon Railway